Das Mädchen aus Domrémy, Op. 72, (The Maid from Domrémy) is an opera in two acts by Giselher Klebe who with his wife, Lore Klebe, also wrote the libretto based on the play Die Jungfrau von Orléans by Friedrich Schiller.

The opera premiered on 19 June 1976 at the Staatsoper Stuttgart. It was conducted by János Kulka, directed by Kurt Horres, and featured Irmgard Stadler (soprano), Enriqueta Attres, Günther Reich (baritone), Raymond Wolansky (baritone), and Toni Krämer (tenor). The music uses twelve-tone and tonal elements and taped sounds. A revised version for a smaller orchestra was premiered on 2 November 1980 at the Oldenburgisches Staatstheater.

Roles

References

Further reading

German-language operas
Operas by Giselher Klebe
Operas
1976 operas
Operas about Joan of Arc
Operas based on plays
Operas based on works by Friedrich Schiller
Twelve-tone compositions